Michel Vaxès (November 14, 1940 – September 18, 2016) was a French politician.

Early life
Michel Vaxès was born on November 14, 1940 in Marseille, Southern France.

Career
Vaxès was a school counsellor.

Vaxès was a member of the French Communist Party. He served on the city council of Port-de-Bouc, and eventually served as its mayor. He also served as a member of the National Assembly of France from 1997 to 2012, representing the Bouches-du-Rhône department.  His parliamentary assistant was Gaby Charroux, who subsequently won his seat in the assembly. In 2003, in the midst of his tenure, he tried to remove the word "race" from the Constitution of France, unsuccessfully.

Personal life and death
Vaxès was married to Renée Vaxès. He had two sons, Erick and Yann. He died of cancer on September 18, 2016. He was 75 years old.

Further reading

References

1940 births
2016 deaths
Politicians from Marseille
French Communist Party politicians
Deaths from cancer in France
Deputies of the 11th National Assembly of the French Fifth Republic
Deputies of the 12th National Assembly of the French Fifth Republic
Deputies of the 13th National Assembly of the French Fifth Republic